Satbaria Union, is a union parishad of the Jessore District in the Division of Khulna, Bangladesh. It has an area of 3.78 square kilometres and a population of 28203.

References

Unions of Keshabpur Upazila
Unions of Jessore District
Unions of Khulna Division